Military Police Regiment may refer to:

 Provost (military police) regiments
 Canadian Forces Military Police regiments:
 1 Military Police Unit (Canada), or "1 Military Police Regiment"
 2 Military Police Unit (Canada), or "2 Military Police Regiment"
 3 Military Police Unit (Canada), or "3 Military Police Regiment"
 5 Military Police Unit (Canada), or "5 Military Police Regiment"
 Canadian Provost Corps was divided into several regiments of military police
 Kempeitai, the Imperial Japanese secret police
 Republic of China Military Police are organized into several regiments
 Military Police (Brazil)'s mounted unit is organized into several regiments
 Royal Military Police is divided into several regiments
 Sri Lanka Corps of Military Police is divided into several regiments
 The United States Army's Military Police Corps is considered a single regiment under USARS